The 2014 FINA Men's Water Polo World League is played between November 2013 and June 2014 and open to all men's water polo national teams. After participating in a preliminary round, eight teams qualify to play in a final tournament, called the Super Final in Dubai, UAE from 16–21 June 2014.

In the world league, there are specific rules that do not allow matches to end in a draw.  If teams are level at the end of the 4th quarter of any world league match, the match will be decided by a penalty shootout. Teams earn points in the standings in group matches as follows:
 Match won in normal time - 3 points
 Match won in shootout - 2 points
 Match lost in shootout - 1 point
 Match lost in normal time - 0 points

Preliminary round

Europe
The European preliminary round consisted of two group of three teams and a third group of four teams. The winner of each group after the home and away series of games qualified for the Super Final.

Group A

Group B

Group C

Intercontinental
The intercontinental tournament will feature teams from Africa, the Americas, Asia and Oceania. The teams are split into two groups of four teams with all teams progressing to the knock-out stage.  As the hosts of the Super Final (UAE) did not enter a team in the tournament the top five teams from this tournament qualified for the Super Final, instead of the initially allocated four.  South Africa withdrew from the tournament before games commenced and were replaced by China II, whose games were exhibition and did not count in the standings.  The games were played between 27 May and 1 June, 2014 in Shanghai, China.

Group A

Group B

Knockout stage

Quarterfinals

Semifinals

5th-place play-off

3rd-place play-off

Final

Super Final
In the Super Final the eight qualifying teams are split into two groups of four teams with all teams progressing to the knock-out stage. The games were played in Dubai, UAE from 16 to 21 June, 2014.

Group A

Group B

Knockout stage

Quarterfinals

Semifinals

7th-place play-off

5th-place play-off

3rd-place play-off

Final

Final ranking

Awards

References

World League, men
FINA Water Polo World League
International water polo competitions hosted by the United Arab Emirates